David Tame (born 1953) is a British author who writes about music and spirituality. Tame earned his Bachelor of Science in Psychology from the University of East London and a Post-Graduate Diploma in Religious Education from Warwick University. Tame was a co-founder in 1981 of The Summit Lighthouse (UK), which is a national religious charity for England and Wales and is a national branch of the Summit Lighthouse headquartered in the United States. Van Morrison recommended Tame's 1984 book The Secret Power of Music as a sourcebook for those interested in the spiritual side of music.

References

Works

Books
 The Secret Power of Music: The Transformation of Self and Society through Musical Energy 1984. Rochester, VT: Destiny Books. .
 Translated into German as Die geheime Macht der Musik: die Transformation des Selbst und der Gesellschaft durch musikalische Energie 1984. Zürich, Switzerland: Pan verlag. 
 Translated into Portuguese as O Poder Oculto Da Musica: A transformação do homem pela energia da música. 1984. Sao Paulo, Brazil: Editora Cultrix. 
 Beethoven and the Spiritual Path 1994. Wheaton, IL: Quest Books. .
 Real Fairies: True Accounts of Meetings with Nature Spirits 1999. Milverton, UK: Capall Bann Publishing. .
 Van Morrison: The 1987 Interviews with David Tame 2013. e-book.

Articles
 "Conspiracy Theory BC: The Forbidden Mysteries of Enoch" Critique #19/20 (Fall/Winter, 1986)
 "Orthodox Christology as a Mechanism of Control" Critique #23/24 (Fall/Winter, 1986/87)
 "Secret Societies in the Life of Karl Marx" Critique #25 (1987) and #27 (1988)
 "Evil and the Imagery of Anti-life in Rock Music" Critique #28 (1988)
 "Sex and Celibacy in Healing and Spirituality" Critique #29 (1988-9)

Living people
1953 births
21st-century British writers
British non-fiction writers
Alumni of the University of East London